Deadworld is an ongoing American comic book published by Desperado Publishing in association with IDW Publishing.

The series follows survivors in a post-apocalyptic scenario brought on by zombie attacks led by King Zombie, an intelligent, talking zombie.

Publication history
Originally published by Arrow Comics, Deadworld was written and created by Stuart Kerr and Ralph Griffith in 1987, scripted by Kerr for the first seven issues and illustrated by Vince Locke. The comic book quickly became a cult favorite success in the independent publisher industry.

Arrow Comics ceased production of all titles, but sold the rights of the title to Locke who transferred the rights to Gary Reed's Caliber Comics. By the twelfth issue of the title, Reed took over as the primary writer. The first volume of Deadworld ended in 1992 after twenty-six issues. One year later, a second volume began. The second volume ended after fifteen issues.

After a lull in its printing, the series returned to print in 2005 through Image Comics, with Gary Reed and Locke working on the series. By issue number 3, Croat comic artist Dalibor Talajić took over illustration duties and completed the story arc of Requiem to the World. Following that, Image released Deadworld: Frozen Over with guest writer Michael Raicht and artist Federico Dallocchio. Deadworld: Bits and Pieces collected the short stories and scenes from various issues and was released through Transfuzion Publishing. Desperado released Deadworld Chronicles which featured all-new short illustrated tales of Deadworld. Deadworld: Slaughterhouse was released in 2010 with artwork from Sami Makkonen in a hardcover edition only. IDW released volumes one and two of  Deadworld Classics which collects the long out-of-print first original 16 issues illustrated by Vince Locke. Gary Reed joined up with Gary Francis for the original graphic novel, Deadworld: The Last Siesta, illustrated by Mark Bloodworth and released through IDW.

In 2012, Gary Reed teamed up again with Sami Makkonen to bring Deadworld into full color for the first time. The five-issue series, "War of the Dead" was released by IDW as a weekly comic series during the month of August and then collected in October. It received a number of award nominations including the Shel Dorf for Best Mini-Series and Comic Monsters.com for Best Mini-Series  and won the Ghastly Award for honoring excellence in horror comics as Best Mini-Series.

In October, 2012, Reed released a special graphic novel-sized book called "Voices from the Deadworld".  This was a series of single-page tales from those who lived and died in Deadworld with each text page accompanied by an original illustration from over 40 various artists.

Also in 2012, Reed licensed Deadworld to PopFunk for T-shirts and to Breygent Marketing for a collector card series. IDW also released the "Deadworld Omnibus" which collected the Image series' "Requiem for the World" and "Frozen Over" plus the "Slaughterhouse" saga from Desperado..

The most recent series was Deadworld: Restoration, the full-color follow-up mini-series to War of the Dead, also from IDW which debuted in December 2013 with the final issue shipping in April 2014.

In 2015, Reed launched Deadworld Zombie Soda, in 12 themed flavors: Orange Roamer (Orange); Goon Bitters (Cherry Cola); Royal Rotter (Black Cherry); Brain Sap (Cream Soda); Zeek Cocktail (Cotton Candy); Geek Juice (Vanilla Cream); Grisly Swill (Grape); Slow Decay (Vanilla Root Beer); Rot Berry (Strawberry); Twilight Shuffler (Root Beer); Morbid Mix (Green Apple); and Graveyard Delight (Ginger Ale). Each soda contains one of 48 label images drawn by various comic book artists. A collectible soda trading card set featuring the label images was also released. Additionally, Deadworld Premium Chips were released in 2 flavors: Original and BBQ.

Issues

Ongoing series
The ongoing series are:

Deadworld vol. 1
 #1-9 (Arrow)
 #10-26 (Caliber)

Deadworld vol. 2
 #1-15 (Caliber)

Limited series
From Caliber:
King Zombie #1-2 
To Kill a King #1-3
Realm of the Dead #1-3
Tattoo #1-4
Deadworld Archives #1-3 (reprints the first three Arrow issues)

From Image
Deadworld vol. 3 #1-6 (2005)
Deadworld Frozen Over

From Desperado
Deadworld Slaughterhouse OGN

From IDW
War of the Dead #1-5
Restoration #1-5

One-shots
One-shots include:
Deadworld: Daemonstorm
Dead Tales
Dead Killer
Deadworld: Necropolis
Deadworld: Plague
Roadkill: A Chronicle of the Deadworld
Dire Wolves: A Chronicle of the Deadworld
Deadworld: Bits & Pieces
Deadworld Chronicles
Deadworld: Voices from the Deadworld

Contributors

Vol. 1
Mark Bloodworth
Paul Daly
Dan Day
Jack Herman
Phil Hester
Stuart Kerr
Vince Locke
Ron McCain
James O'Barr
Scott Parish
Gary Reed
Mark Winfrey

Vol. 2
Chris Morea
Troy Nixey
Gary Reed
Galen Showman
Chris Torres

2005 to present
Mark Bloodworth
Federico Dallocchio
Vince Locke
Sami Makkonen
Mike Raicht
Gary Reed
Dalibor Talajić

Collected editions

The series has been collected into a number of trade paperbacks:

Deadworld Book One (WeeBee did the first print, Caliber did the 2nd and 3rd printings)
Deadworld Book Two (Caliber)
The Killer & The King (Caliber) Reprinted as The Dead Killer (Image)
Realm Of The Dead (Caliber)
Deadworld: Requiem for the World (Image) 
Bits and Pieces: trade collection of shorts and scenes (Transfuzion)
Deadworld Chronicles: All New stories (Desperado)
Deadworld Classic:
 Volume 1 (collects Deadworld #1-8, 288 pages, IDW, August 2010)
 Volume 2 (collects Deadworld #9-18, 272 pages, IDW, July 2011)
Deadworld Omnibus: Volume 1 (reprints Frozen Over, Slaughterhouse and Deadworld vol. 3 352 pages, January 2011, IDW)
Deadworld: War of the Dead 
Deadworld: Restoration Shipping in June 2014. 
Deadworld Archives (Caliber)
Book 1 (2016)  (collects v1 #1–4)
Book 2 (2016)  (collects v1 #5–8, and "Doom Patrol")
Book 3 (2016)  (collects v1 #9–14)
Book 4 (2016)  (collects v1 #15–18, "Deadtales: Amy", and "Deadtales: When a Body Meets a Body")
Book 5 (2016)  (collects v1 #19–23, and "Guns for Sale")
Book 6 (2016)  (collects v1 #24–26, "Dead-Killer", and "A Deadworld Christmas in Louisiana")
Book 7 (2016)  (collects v2 #1–4, "Body of Art", and "City")
Book 8 (2016)  (collects v2 #5–10)
Book 9 (2016)  (collects v2 #11–15)

Deadworld CD-ROM collection library
Eagle One Media collected and released the first 46 issues of the original Deadworld comic book series along with two mini-series onto CD-ROM. Each page from the issues is scanned and viewable on one's PC in protected (non-extractable) PDF format.

Film
In June, 2009, it was announced that Deadworld was to be turned into a film. Jeffrey D. Erb and Framelight Productions along with Dark Hero Studios partners David Hayter and Benedict Carver have teamed up with Bill Mechanic to turn the comic book into a zombie feature franchise. In 2013, Gary Reed announced that the option had expired and he did not renew it. The film has been put back onto the schedule and is now in pre-production for a as yet unknown release.

References

External links

Eagle One Media

1987 comics debuts
Caliber Comics titles
Image Comics titles
Post-apocalyptic comics
Horror comics